Alfred E. Lewis (ca. 1913 – 1994) was an American journalist, best known as the author of the first article in The Washington Post about the burglary at Watergate.

In the 1976 film about the Watergate Scandal, All The President's Men, Lewis was portrayed by Joshua Shelley.

References

The Washington Post people
20th-century American journalists
American male journalists
American crime reporters
1994 deaths
Date of birth uncertain